Corey Jonas Webster (born March 2, 1982) is a former American football cornerback who played for the New York Giants. He was drafted by the Giants in the second round of the 2005 NFL Draft and later won two Super Bowls with the team, both over the New England Patriots. He played college football at Louisiana State University.

High school career
Webster attended St. James High School in Vacherie, Louisiana and was a two sport star in both football and basketball.  He was an all state quarterback wearing jersey #1 for the Wildcats football team and an all state guard wearing jersey #11 for the basketball team.  He was recruited as a wide receiver coming out of high school but was later asked to play cornerback at LSU by then coach Nick Saban.

College career
After catching 7 passes for 74 yards as a true freshman, Webster converted to Cornerback for the 2002 season. He would end his college career with 16 interceptions (2nd in school history), be named as a 1st Team All-American twice, and was a 1st Team All-SEC selection 3 times. As a Junior in 2003, he finished 2nd in the SEC with 25 pass breakups and had 17 as a Sophomore in 2002.

Professional career

New York Giants

2007

In 2007, Webster was limited to special teams duty or even inactive after starting the first few weeks after what was seen as a widely poor performance in the Giants opening weeks of the season.  Later on in the season, he had a good game against the Buffalo Bills in week 16, which was a precursor to his playoff success.  He had an interception and a touchdown against the Bills.  In the Wild Card Playoff game against the Tampa Bay Buccaneers, he intercepted Jeff Garcia in the end zone.  He also recovered a fumble by Buccaneers returner Micheal Spurlock at the beginning of the second half.  This turnover set up a Giant field goal.  In the NFC divisional Playoff game, he came up with near shutdown defense on All-Pro Terrell Owens.  He also made what turned out to be the game-winning interception against the Green Bay Packers in the NFC Championship game, sending the Giants to Super Bowl XLII. This turned out to be Brett Favre's last pass as a Packer.

2008
In Super Bowl XLII, Webster provided a huge performance through the first three quarters.  However, on the go-ahead Patriots scoring drive, he fell down, which allowed New England Patriots receiver Randy Moss to score an easy touchdown on a key third down play, putting the Patriots up 14-10 with less than three minutes to go in the game.  But, he came back to deflect a pass from Tom Brady to Randy Moss on the next drive to prevent the Patriots from scoring, and all but securing the Super Bowl victory.

On December 14, 2008, the New York Giants gave him a 5-year $43.5 million deal with $20 million guaranteed.

2009
During the Giants opening home game against the Redskins on September 13, 2009, Webster was involved in an altercation with Washington Redskins wide receiver Santana Moss. Both players were penalized for Unsportsmanlike Conduct.

2011
Webster had a career-high six interceptions during the 2011 regular season. Webster helped the Giants beat the Patriots for the second time in five years in Super Bowl XLVI by a score of 21-17. He defended 1 pass and recorded a tackle.

2012
Webster had a career-high 58 tackles (52 solo) during the 2012 regular season.

2013
Webster suffered a hip flexor and was questionable for the September 22, 2013 game against the Carolina Panthers.

Statistics
Source:

References

External links

Official Website
New York Giants bio

1982 births
Living people
African-American players of American football
American football cornerbacks
LSU Tigers football players
New York Giants players
Players of American football from Louisiana
People from Vacherie, Louisiana
21st-century African-American sportspeople
20th-century African-American people